Rodrigo Fernandes Alflen or simply Rodrigão (born June 14, 1978 in Santos) is a Brazilian.

Career History
Rodrigao, was a forward that had like strength, the finalizations. He began his career in the Santos-FC base categories in 1995 and defended the club until becoming professional in 1999 by the same team, being loaned for a period of 3 months to Jabaquara Atlético Clube, the city team. Returning to Santos, soon in his first year as a professional, he reached the final of the Rio / São Paulo Tournament against Vasco and was called to the Brazilian Under-23 National Team in a friendly against the United States at the Mané Garrincha Stadium in Brasilia . After suffering the penalty, the young striker converted the charge into a goal, helping the National Team in the victory by 7 to 0. In 2000, was loaned to the Sport Club Internacional where he had the best moment of his career and due to the goal of goal scorer, finished receiving the nickname of Rodrigol. In the same year, was summoned for the Olympic Selection for the dispute of the Olympics of Sidney. However, it ended up being cut, due to an injury. His good performances the interest of several teams, causing Santos to request his return in 2001. Forming an overwhelming attack alongside Dodo and Deivid, led the team the playoffs of the Paulista Championship, being eliminated for Corinthians / SP. In July, it ended up being sold to the French soccer. At Saint-Étienne, he played only 1 season. He returned to Brazil and played in Botafogo / RJ and Guarani / SP. His great passage for the team of Campinas, made the athlete return to European football. In the Marítimo, managed to help the team to qualify for the Cup of Uefa. Due to a knee injury, he rescinded with the Portuguese team, close to terminating his contract. He made the treatment in Santo André, and after recovery, he played in the Campeonato Paulista, Brasileirao Serie B and Libertadores of América, being the top scorer of the competition and becoming the team's scorer of the season. It was negotiated with Atlético-PR. Diagnosed with Hepatitis C, he did not act for 10 months. On his return, he went to Al Hilal, where in addition to reaching the final of the Arab Championship, he qualified the team for the second phase of the Champions League of Asia. He returned to Brazilian football to play for Palmeiras, for 6 months. Due to a flamboyance between Palmeiras and Atletico-PR, he was forced to return to Atletico-PR in early 2008. Little used by the club from Paraná, he was loaned to Vitória, being Champion Baiano and best player of the competition. In 2009, he signed a contract with Guaratinguetá, for the Paulista dispute. In 2010 he played in Santo André, reaching the Paulista final, against the well-known team of Santos, Neymar and cia. In February 2011 he signed with the Associação Atlética Anapolina, but due to a calcaneal tendon injury he was away performing treatment at Corinthians / SP. In 2012, he won the Access Division for Gauchão, with the Aimoré Sports Club. He worked for Portuguesa Santista in 2013 and Jabaquara in 2014. He had a quick stint at the São Carlos Futebol Clube in 2015, returning to Briosa in 2016, where he worked in addition to Gestor. In 2017, he participated in some Indoor Santos games.

External links 
 Sambafoot
 zerozero.pt
 globoesporte
 sopalmeiras
 CBF
 Guardian Stats Centre

References

1978 births
Living people
Sportspeople from Santos, São Paulo
Brazilian footballers
Association football midfielders
Association football forwards
Liga MX players
Santos FC players
Sport Club Internacional players
AS Saint-Étienne players
Botafogo de Futebol e Regatas players
Guarani FC players
C.S. Marítimo players
Esporte Clube Santo André players
Club Athletico Paranaense players
Al Hilal SFC players
Sociedade Esportiva Palmeiras players
Esporte Clube Vitória players
Saudi Professional League players
Florida Tropics SC players